Homi Bhabha Cancer Hospital & Research Centre is a cancer care hospital and research centre in Visakhapatnam, Andhra Pradesh, India. This regional cancer centre is funded by the Government of India and Tata Memorial Centre. The Indian Council of Medical Research has recognized this referral Institution as a research organization.

The director of the Institution, Dr. Digumarti Raghunadharao has been working in the progress since 2013. He has worked in the Nizam's Institute of Medical Sciences, Hyderabad for more than 20 years and was a honoured recipient of Dr. B. C. Roy National Award for 2016.

History
Homi Bhabha Cancer Hospital & Research Centre is supported by Bhabha Atomic Research Centre and Tata Memorial Centre. It was established in 2014. The total project cost is 540 crores.

References

Hospitals in Visakhapatnam
Cancer hospitals
Tata institutions
Medical research institutes in India
Regional Cancer Centres in India
Homi Bhabha National Institute
Research institutes in Andhra Pradesh
Educational institutions in India with year of establishment missing